The Passeirer Gebirgsziege or Capra Passiria is an Italian breed of domestic goat indigenous to the Passeier valley or Val Passiria, in the Autonomous Province of Bolzano in north-eastern Italy. It is raised in that valley and in the neighbouring Sarntal (Val Sarentino), Schnalstal (Val Senales) and upper Wipptal (Alta Vall'Isarco) valleys; it is also present in neighbouring areas of southern Austria. While of Alpine type, it is morphologically quite distinct from the Alpina Comune goat breed. Management is extensive: the animals are kept on alpine pasture from early spring to late autumn.

The Passeirer Gebirgsziege is one of the forty-three autochthonous Italian goat breeds of limited distribution for which a herdbook is kept by the Associazione Nazionale della Pastorizia, the Italian national association of sheep- and goat-breeders. At the end of 2013 the registered population was variously reported as 3354 and as 2531. The population reported for 2021 was just over  head, and the conservation status of the breed in 2023 was 'not at risk'.

References 

Goat breeds
Meat goat breeds
Goat breeds originating in Italy